Mark T. Keane (Irish: Marcus Ó Cathain, born 3 July 1961, Dublin, Ireland) is a cognitive scientist and author of several books on human cognition and artificial intelligence, including  Cognitive Psychology: A Student's Handbook (8 editions, with Michael Eysenck),  Advances in the Psychology of Thinking (1992, with Ken Gilhooly), Novice Programming Environments (1992/2018, with Marc Eisenstadt and Tim Rajan), Advances in Case-Based Reasoning (1995, with J-P Haton and Michel Manago)., Case-Based Reasoning: Research & Development (2022, with N Wiratunga).

Keane has been Chair of Computer Science at University College Dublin  since 1997.   In 2006, he was seconded to the newly established Science Foundation Ireland as Director of ICT, responsible for oversight on a $700m research investment.   He advised the Irish Government on its 3.7B euro Strategy for Science, Technology & Innovation (SSTI). From 2006–2007, he was Director General of  Science Foundation Ireland  before returning to  University College Dublin  where he was appointed VP of Innovation & Partnerships  (2007-2009). 

Keane's research has been split between cognitive science and computer science.  His cognitive science research has been in analogy, metaphor,  conceptual combination and similarity.  His computer science research has been in natural language processing,  machine learning, case-based reasoning, text analytics and explainable artificial intelligence.  He has been a PI in  the  Science Foundation Ireland  funded Insight Centre for Data Analytics  working on digital journalism and digital humanities.  More recently, he was Deputy Director of the VistaMilk SFI Research Centre that is exploring precision agriculture in the dairy sector.

References

External links
 UCD Homepage
 SiliconRepublic.com article "The Keane Edge"
 https://scholar.google.com/citations?user=bBozfc4AAAAJ&hl=en
 VistaMilk Keane PI
  Eysenck & Keane (2020) 
 UCD Appoints Keane as VP

1961 births
Living people
Scientists from Dublin (city)
Academics of Cardiff University
Academics of the Open University
Academics of the University of London
Alumni of University College Dublin
Alumni of Trinity College Dublin
Academics of Trinity College Dublin
Academics of University College Dublin
Natural language processing researchers
Artificial intelligence researchers
Science Foundation Ireland